The 2000 Campeonato Nacional, known as Campeonato Nacional Copa Banco del Estado 2000 for sponsorship purposes, was the 69th season of top-flight football in Chile. Universidad de Chile won their 11th title.  Cobreloa and Deportes Concepción -as Liguilla winners-, also qualified for the next Copa Libertadores.

Standings

Scores

Liguilla Pre-Copa Libertadores

Semifinals

Final 

Deportes Concepción qualified for the 2001 Copa Libertadores

See also
2000 Copa Apertura

References

External links
 RSSSF Chile 2000

Primera División de Chile seasons
1
Chile